The list of urban rail systems in Japan lists urban rail transit systems in Japan, organized by , including number of stations, length (km), and average daily and annual ridership volume.

Considerations
There are several considerations for the data presented in this list.

Station count
Data is broken down at the line level, then rolled up for each specific railway operator. The total station count for each operator is a "unique station" count—an interchange or transfer station between two lines operated by the same company is counted as a single station. As a result, summing together the station counts for all of the lines under a single railway operator will generally yield a value greater than the total station count cited for the operator.

Some station pairs are officially considered interchanges by their respective railway operators despite having different names (e.g., Tameike-Sannō and Kokkai-gijidō-mae on the Tokyo Metro and Tenjin and Tenjin-Minami on the Fukuoka City Subway). As such stations have different names, however, they are counted as separate stations in this list.

Length
In a similar fashion to the station count, length is counted as route kilometers, but only considers "unique" segments. The following considerations are relevant for the lengths referenced in the tables.

Intra-company considerations
Generally, multiple-track sections classified under the same line name and without operational segregation into separate lines are only counted once, not twice. Examples include the quadruple-track sections of the Keihan Main Line and Tōbu Isesaki Line, which are only counted once because fast (i.e., limited-stop) and slow (i.e., local or all-stop) services are branded together as a single line, not separately as distinct lines.

Other cases include double junctions where a double-track branch line ties into a double-track main line, permitting interlining of the branch line with the main line. Examples include Keiō Sagamihara Line trains that continue past Chōfu Station onto the Keiō Line. In this situation, the trackage of the Keiō Sagamihara Line is counted as only the section between Chōfu and Hashimoto Station, while the double-track section east of Chōfu is counted under the Keiō Line, following traditional conventions for railway line nomenclature in Japan.

Likewise, double-track segments shared by lines under the same operator are only counted once. Examples include the Yamanote Freight Line between Ikebukuro and Ōsaki, a segment shared by the Saikyō Line and Shōnan-Shinjuku Line. In this situation, the trackage is counted only once, under the Saikyō Line. Similarly, tabulations for the larger tram systems with a high degree of interlining, such as Hiroshima Electric Railway, also consider only unique segments, and sections where multiple routes overlap are only counted once.

However, if there is some reasonable segregation of operations or distinction between lines, the trackage is counted more than once. Examples include the various quadruple-track sections of East Japan Railway Company (JR East) that provide segregated local and rapid services (e.g., Chūō Rapid Line vs. Chūō-Sōbu Line). Here, the route-kilometers are counted twice, once under the Chūō Rapid Line and again under the local Chūō-Sōbu Line.

Other situations include quadruple-track sections at the confluence of two distinct double-track lines, such as the Ōsaka Uehommachi – Fuse quadruple-track section of the Kintetsu network in central Ōsaka, officially designated as part of the Osaka Line but actually two lines (the Osaka Line and Nara Line) sharing a single right-of-way west of Fuse. A similar situation applies for many JR East lines—the Yamanote Line and Keihin-Tōhoku Line officially use tracks classified as part of the Tōkaidō Main Line and Tōhoku Main Line, but that are fully segregated from the tracks used by the respective services operating under the names "Tōkaidō Line" and "Utsunomiya Line" / "Takasaki Line".

Cross-company considerations

For example, trackage on the Toei Asakusa Line is not counted under Keikyu Corporation, Keisei Electric Railway, or the Hokusō Railway, despite the fact that all three operate their trains on the Asakusa Line. However, this list makes some exceptions to this rule, the most notable being the Keisei-Takasago – Inba-Nihon-Idai section of the Keisei Narita Airport Line, which is shared with trains operated by Hokusō Railway but owned partially by Hokusō Railway (Keisei-Takasago – Komuro) and Chiba New Town Railway (Komuro – Inba-Nihon-Idai). This shared trackage is counted once under Hokusō Railway and again under Keisei Electric Railway.

Similar exceptions include trackage owned by third-sector railways that do not own any of their own rolling stock and instead contract out train operations to through-servicing operators. Notable examples include the double-track approach into Narita Airport, which is owned by the third-sector Narita Airport Rapid Railway. All trains on this railway, however, are operated by either JR East or Keisei Electric Railway, with each operator getting dedicated usage of one of the two tracks into the Airport. In this situation, the JR East single-track section is counted in the JR total, while the Keisei single-track section is counted in the Keisei total.

Ridership
Both average daily and annual ridership are included, because only average daily ridership or annual ridership (not both) is available for some operators. In cases where data for only one of the two is available, care has been taken to not extrapolate the passenger volume to obtain the other, as there is a potential margin of error when attempting to derive average daily ridership from annual ridership (which is usually rounded to the nearest thousand passengers) and natural disasters or other unforeseen situations may force some operators to shut down for extended periods of time, as happened with the Sendai Subway in the days following the 2011 Tōhoku earthquake and tsunami.

Categories
For readability and ease of comparison across metropolitan areas, systems within each metropolitan area are broken down into the following categories:
 Subways are divided into two types: publicly operated and privately owned, and are grouped together with each other regardless of ownership. See  for more details.
 : Systems generally considered "subways" and operated directly by government agencies at the city (e.g., Kobe Municipal Subway) or prefecture (e.g., Toei Subway) level. 
 : Systems generally considered "subways" that are owned by private operators (e.g., Tokyo Metro), as well as third-sector (semi-public) subways (e.g., Minatomirai Line).
 : Any of the 15 private railways (excluding subways) considered by the Ministry of Land, Infrastructure, Transport and Tourism and others to be the largest private railways in Japan (by network length, ridership volume, and other metrics), providing critical urban rail service in the Greater Tokyo, Greater Nagoya, Osaka-Kobe-Kyoto, and Fukuoka-Kitakyūshū areas. Japan Railways Group operators such as JR East or West Japan Railway Company (JR West) are generally not considered major private railways because they are descended from the government-owned Japanese National Railways (JNR), despite their size and their status now as private, for-profit railways, following the dissolution of JNR in 1984.
Examples include Shin-Keisei Electric Railway and Sanyo Electric Railway. Like the major private railways, they provide critical urban rail service in the metropolitan areas.
 Japan Rail metropolitan network: Urban rail services operated by Japan Rail Group companies. While JR Group companies administer networks spanning multiple regions and operate various long-distance and intercity services such as limited expresses and Shinkansen high-speed rail, services in metropolitan areas are often focused on providing urban and suburban transit. JR East, for example, is the largest single urban rail operator in the world, carrying around 14 million passengers daily on its extensive rail network in Greater Tokyo.
 Other major railways: Any other major railways not fitting any of the above four categories. Examples include the Tsukuba Express and the Enoshima Electric Railway.
 Other minor railways: Any other systems which provide rail service in the metropolitan area but do not fall into the above categories. Examples include tourist-heavy lines like the Disney Resort Line (a monorail line primarily serving the Tokyo Disney Resort), local people mover systems such as the Yamaman Yūkarigaoka Line (a small automated guideway transit system primarily serving to connect a new town development with a major suburban railway station), or other minor systems like the Mizuma Railway (a minor private railway in suburban Osaka).

List

See also
Rail transport in Japan
List of railway companies in Japan
List of railway lines in Japan
List of railway stations in Japan
List of through trains in Japan

Notes

References

Japanese railway-related lists
Japan transport-related lists